Paul Andrew Rennie (born 26 October 1971) is an English former footballer who played for Crewe Alexandra, Stoke City and Wigan Athletic.

Career
Rennie began his career with his hometown club Crewe Alexandra playing twice during the 1989–90 season. He left for nearby Stoke City in the summer of 1990 but in his two seasons at the Victoria Ground he failed to make an impression playing in just six matches. He then played two seasons with Wigan Athletic before dropping into non-league football with Nantwich Town.

Career statistics
Source:

A.  The "Other" column constitutes appearances and goals in the Football League Trophy.

Honours
 Stoke City
 Football League Trophy : 1991–92

References

English footballers
Stoke City F.C. players
Crewe Alexandra F.C. players
Wigan Athletic F.C. players
English Football League players
1971 births
Living people
Nantwich Town F.C. players
Association football defenders